is a Japanese footballer who plays as an attacking midfielder or a winger for Júbilo Iwata.

Career
In May 2017, following Karlsruher SC's relegation from the 2. Bundesliga in the 2017–18, Yamada announced his decision to leave the club ending a three-year spell there.
In August 2017, he returned to Japan with Júbilo Iwata.

Club statistics

1Includes Suruga Bank Championship.

National team statistics

Honours

Club
Júbilo Iwata
Suruga Bank Championship (1) : 2011
J2 League : 2021

Japan
EAFF East Asian Cup (1) : 2013

References

External links
 
 
 
 Japan National Football Team Database
 Hiroki Yamada at Júbilo Iwata official site 
 Hiroki Yamada – Yahoo! Japan competition record 

1988 births
Living people
Meiji University alumni
Association football midfielders
Association football people from Shizuoka Prefecture
Japanese footballers
Japan international footballers
J1 League players
J2 League players
2. Bundesliga players
Júbilo Iwata players
Karlsruher SC players
Universiade bronze medalists for Japan
Universiade medalists in football
Medalists at the 2009 Summer Universiade